Omar Menghi (born 18 October 1975) is an Italian motorcycle racer. His brother, Fabio Menghi, is also a motorcycle racer.

Career statistics

Grand Prix motorcycle racing

By season

Races by year
(key)

References

External links
 Profile on MotoGP.com

1975 births
Living people
Italian motorcycle racers
250cc World Championship riders
Sportspeople from Rimini